The Sarah Baartman is a South African environmental protection vessel—of the Damen Offshore Patrol Vessel 8313 class.
The Sarah Baartman was commissioned on 10 January 2005.
Named after Khoikhoi woman, Sarah Baartman, she was built by Damen Group, of the Netherlands, at one of its Romanian shipyards, and was designed to be capable of patrolling South Africa's entire EEZ, including the area around the southerly Prince Edward Islands.

On 3 October 2007 the Sarah Baartman took custody of two men accused of murdering a fellow crew member of the South African icebreaker S. A. Agulhas.

The South African government has been criticized for chartering the Sarah Baartman to support offshore oil drilling.

The vessels carry limited equipment for enclosing and skimming oil spills, and fire-fighting water cannons.

See also 
Sarah Baartman

References

External links
Towards delivery of Sarah Baartman
Fact file: Sarah Baartman

Patrol vessels of South Africa
2004 ships